Talorc m. Achiuir is a legendary Pictish monarch known only from regnal lists.

References

Pictish monarchs
5th-century Scottish monarchs
4th-century Scottish monarchs